is a Japanese former professional baseball pitcher. He has played in his entire career with the Nippon Professional Baseball (NPB) for the Hokkaido Nippon-Ham Fighters.

Career
Hokkaido Nippon-Ham Fighters selected Urano with the second selection in the 2013 Nippon Professional Baseball draft.

On April 5, 2014, Urano made his NPB debut.

On October 27, 2020, Urano announced his retirement.

References

External links

 NPB.com

1989 births
Living people
Baseball people from Shizuoka Prefecture
Hokkaido Nippon-Ham Fighters players
Japanese baseball players
Nippon Professional Baseball pitchers